Saint-Lary is a commune in the Ariège department in southwestern France.

It is located on the former Route nationale 618, the "Route of the Pyrenees".

Population
Inhabitants of Saint-Lary are called Saint-Hilariens.

See also
Communes of the Ariège department

References

Communes of Ariège (department)
Ariège communes articles needing translation from French Wikipedia